Statistics is a mathematical science pertaining to the collection, analysis, interpretation, and presentation of data.

Statistic may also refer to:

 Statistic, the result of applying a statistical algorithm to a set of data
 Statistic (role-playing games), a piece of data which represents a particular aspect of a fictional character
 Statistics (band), an American rock band
 "Statistics" (song), by Lyfe Jennings, 2010